Tal-e Gavi (also Romanized as Tal-e Gāvī and Tall-e Gāvī; also known as Tall Gāh) is a village in Dana Rural District, in the Central District of Dana County, Kohgiluyeh and Boyer-Ahmad Province, Iran. At the 2006 census, its population was 118, in 30 families.

References 

Populated places in Dana County